Article Six may refer to:

 Article Six of the United States Constitution
 Article 6 of the European Convention on Human Rights
 Article 6 of the Soviet Constitution
 Article 6 of the Paris Agreement